Andrew Marsh Wilson (16 May 1954 – 5 June 2018) was a New Zealand cricketer. He was a left-handed batsman who played for Wellington. He was born in Wellington.

Wilson made four appearances in the 1979-80 Shell Trophy. In five innings in the competition, he made a top score of 28 runs, achieved on his debut, against Auckland.

Wellington finished just two points off the top of the Shell Trophy table, two points behind leaders Northern Districts.

External links

1954 births
2018 deaths
New Zealand cricketers
Wellington cricketers